Kaunissaare is a village in Anija Parish, Harju County, Estonia, south and south-east of the town of Kehra. 

The village is situated around the Kaunissaare reservoir and on the right bank of the Jägala river. 

As of August 1, 2020, the village had a population of 89.

History 
Kaunissaare manor was first mentioned in 1326 but it disappeared in the following centuries. The manor's mill is known to have been operating until the manor was re-established in 1815 as a half-manor. The manor's main building burnt down in 1945. Several other buildings that belonged to the manor complex were destroyed and flooded in the beginning of 1980's, when the reservoir was being built on the Jägala river. The reservoir is part of the Tallinn water supply system and is connected via canals to Pirita, Aavoja and Soodla rivers. The node was opened in 1984. Kaunissaare fish passage was built in 2015.

References

Further reading 
 Miidla, Ants (2014). Kehra Lood (in Estonian). MTÜ Kehra Raudteejaam. .

External links 
 Anija Parish homepage

Villages in Harju County
Kreis Harrien